Christopher William Valentine (born December 6, 1961) is a Canadian former professional ice hockey player and coach.

Biography
Valentine was born in Belleville, Ontario and raised in Kanata, Ontario. As a youth, he played in the 1973 and 1974 Quebec International Pee-Wee Hockey Tournaments with a minor ice hockey team from North Shore.

Valentine began his hockey career in 1978 at St. Louis University before moving to the QMJHL's Sorel Black Hawks. He was selected in the 1981 NHL Entry Draft in the tenth round by the Washington Capitals. Starting with the 1981–82 NHL season he played for the Capitals and their farm team, the Hershey Bears in the American Hockey League. He played 105 NHL games, all with the Capitals, during his career.

As a free agent following the 1983–84 NHL season, Valentine elected to sign in Germany with DEG in Düsseldorf. From 1990-93 and again in 1996, Valentine led DEG to the German national championship. By the end of his career in 1996 he had played 571 games for DEG.

After the end of his playing career Valentine became a coach, accepting the head coaching position with DEG in 1997. In 1998 he moved to the EV Landshut, later to Adler Mannheim and in 2001 to the Krefeld Pinguine. In 2003, Valentine ended his coaching career in Germany and returned to his native Canada with his family. In December 2006 he took over as head coach of the EHC Black Wings Linz of the Austrian Hockey League and returned to Canada at the end of the 2006-07 season due to personal reasons.

Valentine is the father of Canadian figure skater and television personality Mandy Valentine.

Awards and honours
DEG has retired Valentine's number 10.

References

External links

 
 Profile at hockeydraftcentral.com

1961 births
Living people
Canadian ice hockey centres
Düsseldorfer EG players
Canadian expatriate ice hockey players in Austria
Hershey Bears players
Ice hockey people from Ottawa
Sorel Éperviers players
Washington Capitals draft picks
Washington Capitals players
Canadian expatriate ice hockey players in Germany
Canadian expatriate ice hockey players in West Germany
Canadian expatriate ice hockey players in the United States
Canadian ice hockey coaches